The Northwestern Livestock Journal (1883–1892) was a weekly newspaper from Cheyenne, Wyoming. It was published by Mercer & Marney, specifically Asa Shinn Mercer. It was a public relations vehicle for cattle interests.  After the Johnson County War, Mercer switched sides and recounted the invasion in the week's columns on October 12, 1892, just three weeks before elections.  Denounced as the author if not the instigator of the plan, two years later he wrote The Banditti of the Plains from the opposing side. His newspaper office was torched and the book's entire second edition was hijacked en route from Denver.

The coverage was from Cheyenne to Laramie.

References 

Publications established in 1883
Publications disestablished in 1892
Weekly newspapers published in the United States
Newspapers published in Wyoming
Livestock